Waldbach may refer to:

 Waldbach, Styria, a former municipality in Styria, Austria
 Waldbach-Mönichwald, a municipality in Styria, Austria
 Waldbach, a former municipality, today part of Bretzfeld, Baden-Württemberg, Germany
 Waldbach (Gürzenicher Bach), a river of North Rhine-Westphalia, Germany, tributary of the Gürzenicher Bach
 Waldbach (Waldbach), tributary of the similar named river Waldbach above that is a tributary of the Gürzenicher Bach
 Waldbach (Röhr), a river of North Rhine-Westphalia, Germany, tributary of the Röhr
 Waldbach (Schwalbach), a river of Hesse, Germany, tributary of the Schwalbach